"When Julie Comes Around" is a song written by Lee Pockriss and Paul Vance. It was first released as "When Joes Comes Around" by Tasha Thomas in July 1969, but this version failed to chart. The song is best known for the version by the Cuff Links released in November 1969, which peaked at number 41 on the US Billboard Hot 100 and number 10 on the UK Singles Chart.

Release and reception
The Cuff Links released "When Julie Comes Around" as the follow-up to their international debut hit "Tracy". Featuring Ron Dante on vocals, it was released with the B-side "Sally Ann (You're Such a Pretty Baby)", also written by Pockriss and Vance. Despite being released in North America in November 1969, the single was not released in the Europe until February 1970.

In Cash Box, it was described as "a glittery ballad enhanced by non-intrusive rhythmic electricity and a catchy production flavoring to spice up the overall action". Billboard wrote that "this powerful follow-up is sure to repeat its success".

Track listing
7": Decca / 732592
 "When Julie Comes Around" – 2:44
 "Sally Ann (You're Such a Pretty Baby)" – 2:46

Chart performance

References

External links
 

1969 songs
1969 singles
Songs written by Lee Pockriss
Songs written by Paul Vance
Decca Records singles